Second Church of Dorchester is a Church of the Nazarene in the historic Codman Square District of Dorchester in Boston, Massachusetts. In 1804 the church was founded as the Dorchester Meeting House Company by members from the First Parish Church of Dorchester.

In 1806 the Harvard graduate John Codman was ordained as the church´s first minister. Notable attendees during Dr. Codman´s ministry tenure included John Adams and Daniel Webster. Paul Revere & Sons cast the bell for the church tower. Colonel William Baker donated the clock for the church tower. The church also houses a pipe organ. The church was originally Congregational but became a Church of the Nazarene in 1991.

References
 Puritan Heritage: a brief history of Second Church in Dorchester, compiled by Janet L. Robertson, Church Historian. 1955.
 Second Church of Dorchester: History.
 National Register of Historic Places: Codman Square District
 ¨A discourse delivered in the Second Congregational Church, Dorchester, Ms., Monday, Dec. 27, 1847 : at the funeral of Rev. John Codman, D.D., late pastor of said church¨ Richard S. Storrs. ABIGAIL: the Library Catalog of the Massachusetts Historical Society

Churches in Boston